AJWright (formerly formatted as A.J. Wright until 2009) was a chain of about 129 American retail/outlet stores established in 1998 and owned by TJX Companies. Like its sister company T.J. Maxx, AJWright sold clothing, domestics, giftware, footwear, accessories, and fragrances at prices between twenty and seventy percent below regular prices. AJWright differed from other TJX chains by refreshing its merchandise on a regular basis. For most stores, new shipments arrived every weekday. In early 2011, TJX closed the chain's remaining stores and converted some stores to other TJX brands.

Although AJWright's primary target market was moderate-income families, its recent expansion drew additional consumer groups. The company's community service strategy centered on monetary donations to the Boys & Girls Clubs of America and other affiliates.

History

AJWright opened its first six stores in the northeastern region of the United States in the fall of 1998. The first three stores – located in the towns of Brockton, Somerville, and Malden, Massachusetts – were opened simultaneously on September 20 of that year. During the initial openings, Johnson & Wales University's marketing director, Mark Neckes, approved of AJWright; he stated that AJWright strengthens TJX's coverage of urban markets, an area "where people need a place to shop [and] a place where retailers understand what people are looking for".

AJWright continued to open new stores as its customer base increased. By 2000, AJWright operated 25 stores across the United States; by December 2001, the number had increased to 40. The chain opened an additional 112 stores by the end of 2005, bringing its total to 152; however, this number fluctuated due to store closures. In 2006, one business article stated that AJWright was "in the red" and that TJX needed to "figure out the future of its newer divisions, the less profitable AJWright and HomeGoods stores and the non-off-price Bob’s Stores". Therefore, the company chose to focus on lowering the rapid expansion of the chain.

On November 30, 2006, TJX announced the closure of 34 underproducing stores. According to a TJX 10-Q on December 1, 2006, the closures were determined by "several factors, including market demographics and proximity to other AJWright stores, cash return, sales volume and productivity, recent comparable store sales and profit trends, and overall market performance". Employees were provided with severance packages or offers to transfer to other AJWright or TJX stores. Ben Cammarata, CEO of TJX Companies, stated:

The tentative closure date for the stores was January 27, 2007. Because of closing expenses, TJX expected to include a reduction of $37 million in their fourth quarter 2006 net income statement. On February 21, 2007, TJX reported that the net income had fallen from $288.7 million the previous year to $205.5 million; the reduction included the $37 million closing expenses. The company expected to open about ten new stores by 2008.

During this period, the TJX database was hacked and customer information was compromised. Although TJX originally stated that the security breach occurred between May 2006 and January 2007, the company discovered that the database had also been compromised in 2005.

In December, 2010 TJX corporation announced a consolidation that would eliminate the A.J. Wright chain. Many A.J. Wright stores were converted into T.J. Maxx, Marshalls or HomeGoods stores, while the remaining were permanently shuttered along with distribution centers. The entire process resulted in approximately 4400 layoffs.

Slogans
 "Part of your family. Part of your community."
 "More of what you like, for less."
 "A whole lot more for a whole lot less. Every day."

See also
BJ's Wholesale Club
Home Club
Zayre

References

External links
AJWright Official Website
TJX Companies Official Website
Demographics breakdown for the company website

TJX Companies
American companies established in 1998
Retail companies established in 1998
Defunct discount stores of the United States
Retail companies disestablished in 2011
Companies based in Framingham, Massachusetts
Defunct companies based in Massachusetts